A K M Rezaul Mazid ndc, afwc, psc is a major general in the Bangladesh Army. He is the incumbent Chief Consultant General of Construction Supervision of the Padma Multipurpose Bridge.

Career 
Mazid served as Director of Directorate of Works and Chief Engineer (Army) in Army Headquarters in Military Engineers' Services until 2022. Earlier, he was Director General of Bangladesh Army 34 Engineer Construction Brigade. He was Project Director of country's first six-lane flyover at Mohipal in Feni. In November 2022, he become CCG in replace of Major General F M Zahid Hossain.

References 

Bangladesh Army generals
Living people
Year of birth missing (living people)